Pseudotaranis is a genus of sea snails, marine gastropod mollusks in the family Pseudomelatomidae, the turrids.

Species
Species within the genus Pseudotaranis include:
 Pseudotaranis hyperia (Dall, 1919)
 Pseudotaranis strongi (Arnold, 1903)

References

External links
 
 Bouchet, P.; Kantor, Y. I.; Sysoev, A.; Puillandre, N. (2011). A new operational classification of the Conoidea (Gastropoda). Journal of Molluscan Studies. 77(3): 273-308
 Worldwide Mollusc Species Data Base: Pseudomelatomidae

 
Pseudomelatomidae
Gastropod genera